The Nagatinsky Constituency (No.201) is a Russian legislative constituency in Moscow. For several years it was based in Southern and South-Eastern Moscow adjacent to the Centre of Moscow.

Members elected

Election results

1993

|-
! colspan=2 style="background-color:#E9E9E9;text-align:left;vertical-align:top;" |Candidate
! style="background-color:#E9E9E9;text-align:left;vertical-align:top;" |Party
! style="background-color:#E9E9E9;text-align:right;" |Votes
! style="background-color:#E9E9E9;text-align:right;" |%
|-
|style="background-color: " |
|align=left|Andrey Volkov
|align=left|Independent
|44,861
|17.68%
|-
|style="background-color:#0085BE" |
|align=left|Lev Ponomaryov
|align=left|Choice of Russia
| -
|14.90%
|-
| colspan="5" style="background-color:#E9E9E9;"|
|- style="font-weight:bold"
| colspan="3" style="text-align:left;" | Total
| 253,742
| 100%
|-
| colspan="5" style="background-color:#E9E9E9;"|
|- style="font-weight:bold"
| colspan="4" |Source:
|
|}

1995

|-
! colspan=2 style="background-color:#E9E9E9;text-align:left;vertical-align:top;" |Candidate
! style="background-color:#E9E9E9;text-align:left;vertical-align:top;" |Party
! style="background-color:#E9E9E9;text-align:right;" |Votes
! style="background-color:#E9E9E9;text-align:right;" |%
|-
|style="background-color: #3A46CE" |
|align=left|Eduard Vorobyov
|align=left|Democratic Choice of Russia – United Democrats
|67,435
|22.43%
|-
|style="background-color: " |
|align=left|Vadim Artemyev
|align=left|Independent
|50,374
|16.76%
|-
|style="background-color: " |
|align=left|Yevgeniya Dudko
|align=left|Communist Party
|35,399
|11.77%
|-
|style="background-color: #1A1A1A" |
|align=left|Andrey Golovin
|align=left|Stanislav Govorukhin Bloc
|21,860
|7.27%
|-
|style="background-color: #2C299A" |
|align=left|Vyacheslav Zubenko
|align=left|Congress of Russian Communities
|12,093
|4.02%
|-
|style="background-color: #1C1A0D" |
|align=left|Aleksandr Koryev
|align=left|Forward, Russia!
|11,346
|3.77%
|-
|style="background-color: " |
|align=left|Vladimir Kiselev
|align=left|Agrarian Party
|6,970
|2.32%
|-
|style="background-color: " |
|align=left|Aleksey Groza
|align=left|Liberal Democratic Party
|6,518
|2.17%
|-
|style="background-color: #DA2021" |
|align=left|Yury Pal'chikov
|align=left|Ivan Rybkin Bloc
|6,496
|2.16%
|-
|style="background-color: " |
|align=left|Nikolay Nadysev
|align=left|Independent
|6,392
|2.12%
|-
|style="background-color: " |
|align=left|Yelena Mavrodi
|align=left|Independent
|4,970
|1.65%
|-
|style="background-color: #2998D5" |
|align=left|Viktor Nesterov
|align=left|Russian All-People's Movement
|4,734
|1.57%
|-
|style="background-color: " |
|align=left|Sergey Kondratenko
|align=left|Independent
|3,371
|1.12%
|-
|style="background-color: " |
|align=left|Vyacheslav Poplavsky
|align=left|Front of National Salvation
|2,246
|0.75%
|-
|style="background-color: #DD137B" |
|align=left|Vyacheslav Poplavsky
|align=left|Social Democrats
|1,881
|0.63%
|-
|style="background-color:#000000"|
|colspan=2 |against all
|51,190
|17.03%
|-
| colspan="5" style="background-color:#E9E9E9;"|
|- style="font-weight:bold"
| colspan="3" style="text-align:left;" | Total
| 300,637
| 100%
|-
| colspan="5" style="background-color:#E9E9E9;"|
|- style="font-weight:bold"
| colspan="4" |Source:
|
|}

1999

|-
! colspan=2 style="background-color:#E9E9E9;text-align:left;vertical-align:top;" |Candidate
! style="background-color:#E9E9E9;text-align:left;vertical-align:top;" |Party
! style="background-color:#E9E9E9;text-align:right;" |Votes
! style="background-color:#E9E9E9;text-align:right;" |%
|-
|style="background-color: #3B9EDF"|
|align=left|Valery Draganov
|align=left|Fatherland – All Russia
|88,181
|29.80%
|-
|style="background-color:#1042A5"|
|align=left|Eduard Vorobyov (incumbent)
|align=left|Union of Right Forces
|42,307
|14.30%
|-
|style="background-color: " |
|align=left|Valery Saykin
|align=left|Communist Party
|30,648
|10.36%
|-
|style="background-color: #020266" |
|align=left|Yury Bryntsalov
|align=left|Russian Socialist Party
|25,587
|8.65%
|-
|style="background-color: " |
|align=left|Gennady Anichkin
|align=left|Independent
|19,260
|6.51%
|-
|style="background-color: #FCCA19" |
|align=left|Olga Serebryannikova
|align=left|Congress of Russian Communities-Yury Boldyrev Movement
|10,929
|3.69%
|-
|style="background-color: " |
|align=left|Yelena Veduta
|align=left|Independent
|9,819
|3.32%
|-
|style="background-color: " |
|align=left|Oleg Kas'ko
|align=left|Liberal Democratic Party
|5,654
|1.91%
|-
|style="background-color: " |
|align=left|Vadim Burkovsky
|align=left|Independent
|4,618
|1.56%
|-
|style="background-color:#000000"|
|colspan=2 |against all
|49,874
|16.85%
|-
| colspan="5" style="background-color:#E9E9E9;"|
|- style="font-weight:bold"
| colspan="3" style="text-align:left;" | Total
| 295,917
| 100%
|-
| colspan="5" style="background-color:#E9E9E9;"|
|- style="font-weight:bold"
| colspan="4" |Source:
|
|}

2003

|-
! colspan=2 style="background-color:#E9E9E9;text-align:left;vertical-align:top;" |Candidate
! style="background-color:#E9E9E9;text-align:left;vertical-align:top;" |Party
! style="background-color:#E9E9E9;text-align:right;" |Votes
! style="background-color:#E9E9E9;text-align:right;" |%
|-
|style="background-color: "|
|align=left|Valery Draganov (incumbent)
|align=left|United Russia
|104,467
|37.55%
|-
|style="background-color: " |
|align=left|Nikolay Moskovchenko
|align=left|Rodina
|35,568
|12.78%
|-
|style="background-color: #1042A5" |
|align=left|Sergey Gorodilin
|align=left|Union of Right Forces
|26,290
|9.45%
|-
|style="background-color: " |
|align=left|Aleksandr Kozlov
|align=left|Communist Party
|21,324
|7.66%
|-
|style="background-color: #00A1FF" |
|align=left|Nadezhda Novichikhina
|align=left|Party of Russia's Rebirth-Russian Party of Life
|13,429
|4.83%
|-
|style="background-color: " |
|align=left|Yury Kaminsky
|align=left|Liberal Democratic Party
|12,204
|4.39%
|-
|style="background-color:#000000"|
|colspan=2 |against all
|58,143
|20.90%
|-
| colspan="5" style="background-color:#E9E9E9;"|
|- style="font-weight:bold"
| colspan="3" style="text-align:left;" | Total
| 280,374
| 100%
|-
| colspan="5" style="background-color:#E9E9E9;"|
|- style="font-weight:bold"
| colspan="4" |Source:
|
|}

2016

|-
! colspan=2 style="background-color:#E9E9E9;text-align:left;vertical-align:top;" |Candidate
! style="background-color:#E9E9E9;text-align:left;vertical-align:top;" |Party
! style="background-color:#E9E9E9;text-align:right;" |Votes
! style="background-color:#E9E9E9;text-align:right;" |%
|-
|style="background-color: " |
|align=left|Yelena Panina
|align=left|United Russia
|70,518
|40.23%
|-
|style="background-color: " |
|align=left|Kirill Goncharov
|align=left|Yabloko
|19,390
|11.06%
|-
|style="background-color: " |
|align=left|Vladimir Svyatoshenko
|align=left|Communist Party
|18,226
|10.40%
|-
|style="background-color: " |
|align=left|Dmitry Nikolaev
|align=left|Liberal Democratic Party
|14,262
|8.14%
|-
|style="background-color: " |
|align=left|Andrey Nagibin
|align=left|A Just Russia
|10,058
|5.74%
|-
|style="background: ;"| 
|align=left|Natalya Mikhal'chenko
|align=left|People's Freedom Party
|7,812
|4.46%
|-
|style="background: "| 
|align=left|Yulia Zhandarova
|align=left|The Greens
|7,534
|4.30%
|-
|style="background-color: " |
|align=left|Georgy Fedorov
|align=left|Rodina
|6,866
|3.92%
|-
|style="background: "| 
|align=left|Valery Smirnov
|align=left|Patriots of Russia
|6,804
|3.88%
|-
|style="background: #E62020;"| 
|align=left|Vladimir Strukov
|align=left|Communists of Russia
|4,393
|2.51%
|-
|style="background-color: " |
|align=left|Iosif Dzhagaev
|align=left|Party of Growth
|3,887
|2.22%
|-
| colspan="5" style="background-color:#E9E9E9;"|
|- style="font-weight:bold"
| colspan="3" style="text-align:left;" | Total
| 175,290
| 100%
|-
| colspan="5" style="background-color:#E9E9E9;"|
|- style="font-weight:bold"
| colspan="4" |Source:
|
|}

2021

|-
! colspan=2 style="background-color:#E9E9E9;text-align:left;vertical-align:top;" |Candidate
! style="background-color:#E9E9E9;text-align:left;vertical-align:top;" |Party
! style="background-color:#E9E9E9;text-align:right;" |Votes
! style="background-color:#E9E9E9;text-align:right;" |%
|-
|style="background-color: " |
|align=left|Svetlana Razvorotneva
|align=left|United Russia
|81,664
|35.72%
|-
|style="background-color: " |
|align=left|Anastasia Udaltsova
|align=left|Communist Party
|57,840
|25.30%
|-
|style="background-color: "|
|align=left|Aleksey Demin
|align=left|New People
|21,758
|9.52%
|-
|style="background-color: " |
|align=left|Armen Gasparyan
|align=left|A Just Russia — For Truth
|16,785
|7.34%
|-
|style="background-color: " |
|align=left|Vladimir Bernev
|align=left|Liberal Democratic Party
|13,802
|6.04%
|-
|style="background-color: " |
|align=left|Gleb Tumanov
|align=left|Yabloko
|8,736
|3.82%
|-
|style="background-color: " |
|align=left|Anna Udalova
|align=left|Communists of Russia
|8,844
|3.87%
|-
|style="background-color: "|
|align=left|Denis Kulikov
|align=left|Russian Party of Freedom and Justice
|6,867
|3.00%
|-
|style="background-color: " |
|align=left|Stanislav Chernikov
|align=left|Party of Growth
|3,586
|1.57%
|-
|style="background: ;"| 
|align=left|Nazirzhon Abduganiev
|align=left|Green Alternative
|3,215
|1.41%
|-
| colspan="5" style="background-color:#E9E9E9;"|
|- style="font-weight:bold"
| colspan="3" style="text-align:left;" | Total
| 228,597
| 100%
|-
| colspan="5" style="background-color:#E9E9E9;"|
|- style="font-weight:bold"
| colspan="4" |Source:
|
|}

Notes

Sources
201. Нагатинский одномандатный избирательный округ

References

Russian legislative constituencies
Politics of Moscow